A micro job is a temporary, task-type job of all types, often booked through the Internet. Work may included online or in-person jobs, such as writing blogs, virtual assistant, handyman, nanny, website design, dog boarding or errands, etc. The income varies depending on the job and the fee charged by the micro jobs website.

History 
World War II sparked the beginning of temporary work, when housewives were employed to fill jobs vacated by men deployed to war Employers found temporary workers attractive, as they could be hired as needed and often worked hours which did not require payment of benefits and detailed paperwork. Additionally, companies could try before buy, and hire only stellar employees for full-time positions. The number of temporary workers in the United States has steadily increased.

The Internet changed how workers find jobs. Websites made it possible for workers with an Internet connected device (computer, smartphone or tablet) to find virtual jobs both in their current city and worldwide. Worker vetting processes, and on-line job review systems, build trust; which allows strangers to connect with increasing frequency.

On-line micro job marketplaces offer a venue for workers, or newly termed micropreneurs, to grow their business by building up positive reviews and star-ratings. The micropreneur may then launch the business and become a traditional business owner if desired. In the past, workers were relied on classified advertisements or word-of-mouth for jobs which, offered payment, but had no safety measures and no information in regard to the person posting the job. Additionally there was no way to find temporary jobs on a real-time basis or post that a worker is available for work now.  Its equivalent in the non-profit world is called "micro-volunteering" whereby individuals donate their time and skills to undertake micro-tasks such as tagging pictures or transcribing handwritten messages in support of development projects worldwide.

Controversies 
Micro job workers are independent contractors and are legally responsible for their actions. The law is murky, however, on the relationship between micro job workers and marketplaces where workers find jobs. Lawsuits are expected to test this connection. In January, 2014 the Kuang-Liu family, of San Francisco, Ca.; filed a wrongful death lawsuit against Uber and driver Syed Muzzafar. The accident, which caused the death of their 6-year-old daughter and injured two other family members, was allegedly caused while Muzzafar was fulfilling a driving job from Uber.

Individual auto insurance policies do not cover commercial activities, which may result in denials of claims if drivers are working for hire. To prevent legal complications, some ride service providers are requiring their drivers to purchase commercial insurance. Legislation for micro job worker issues remains unclear and unresolved.

Advantages
Micro jobs allow people to earn income to pay rent, expenses, or just earn extra spending money. Young workers may also use micro jobs as a great first step toward independence. Having a micro job can help with resume building, can set up future business relationships, and may evolve into full-time work. Micro jobs can also be done by people working from home who are self-employed. The number of websites listing micro jobs are growing and offer thousands of different micro services

Micro jobs sites are growing rapidly and creating a new type of on-demand income for workers. Micro jobs sites are earning billions of dollars.

Disadvantages
Most micro jobs don't pay benefits. Also, work might fluctuate, which means workers can't rely on a steady paycheck.  Other disadvantages include difficulty in finding quality jobs, managing work and life balance, and the solitude of online work.

Additionally, in the U.S., as an "independent contractor" one is obligated to report and pay income taxes on all income generated through one's commercial activities, including the performance of "micro jobs." The U.S. Tax Code, enforced by the Internal Revenue Service (IRS), requires all self-employed individuals to file quarterly tax returns detailing (among other things) any and all amounts earned from said activity, estimated annual income (from all sources, including that derived from hourly wages), as well as advance payment of income taxes based upon estimated earnings from said activity. These returns are required to be filed quarterly (every three months), and failure to do so may/will result in penalties and interest being assessed on any unpaid amounts due to the IRS. In addition, failure to estimate annual income within a 10% margin may result in additional penalties being assessed, and failure to meet all of the requirements could result in collection action being initiated by the IRS, which could include wage garnishment and seizure of personal assets, including vehicles, real property and bank accounts.

The advice of a professional financial advisor should be sought before engaging in any independent earning activities (including "micro jobs") in the U.S. to determine exactly what requirements and obligations are under the law and the U.S. Tax Code.

See also
 Freelancer
 Online volunteering
 Temporary work

References

Crowdsourcing
Business terms
Digital labor